Mamıq or (Mamuq) (?-1498/1499), was khan of the Khanate of Kazan and was possibly the same person who was Khan of the Siberia Khanate. After murdering Ibak Khan in 1495, Mamuq left Tyumen Ulus and shifted his capital to Qashliq better known as Sibir. He led faithful Tyumen troops and Nogais to invade Kazan in 1495-96. 

With the support of coup of Qarachi Qol Muhammad Mamuq occupied Kazan in 1495 becoming  Khan of Kazan from 1495–1496. He struggled against the local nobility and tried to centralize power. Finding the people and nobility of Kazan resistant and fearing the possible arrival of Russian reinforcements, Mamuq left Kazan and died on his way home in 1497-98.

1498 deaths
Khanate of Kazan
15th-century monarchs in Europe
Year of birth unknown